Bo is a 2010 Belgian film directed by Hans Herbots based on the novel Het engelenhuis by the Belgian author Dirk Bracke. It tells the story of a fifteen-year-old girl, Deborah (played by Ella-June Henrard), who, in an attempt to escape from the triviality of her life in the suburbs of Antwerp, becomes involved in high-end prostitution.

Awards
Giffoni Film Festival 2010:
 CIAL Aluminium Award
 Crystal Gryphon Award
 Award of province Salerno

References

External links 
 
 

Belgian drama films
Films based on Belgian novels
2010 films
2010s Dutch-language films